Muthesius is the surname of following people

Anna Muthesius (1870–1961), German singer, German couturier and interior designer
Eckart Muthesius (1904–1989), German architect and interior designer
 (1885–1977), German social worker, lawyer and social reformer
Hermann Muthesius (1861–1927), German architect, co-founder of Deutscher Werkbund
 (1900–1979), German business journalist
Winfried Muthesius (born 1957), German painter, photographer and installation artist

Other uses
 in Kiel, Germany
The Muthesius building at the Nauen Transmitter Station